Karma is a 1933 bilingual film starring Devika Rani and Himanshu Rai. The film was directed by J.L. Freer Hunt and was a joint production between India, Germany and United Kingdom. Karma featured a four-minute kissing scene between the lead actors—Devika Rani and Rai—the longest in an Indian film. However, this has been incorrectly reported. The kissing scene features a series of kisses and is less than 2 minutes long.

Plot
The story is about a princess (played by Devika Rani) who falls in love with a neighbouring prince much to the disapproval of the latter's father.

Cast
 Devika Rani as The Princess
 Sudha Rani as Her Companion
 Himansu Rai as The Prince
 Dewan Sharar as His Father, the Maharaja
 Abraham Sofaer as The Holy Man
 Kander as The Beggar
 Anil Chakrabarti as The Beater
 Ranabir Sen as His Father
 Amal Banerji as The Snake Charmer

Production
The female lead Devika Rani, the grand niece of Nobel laureate Rabindranath Tagore was professionally associated with Rai even before the two married in 1929. Impressed by her talent, Rai decided to cast her in the film alongside him. Abraham Sofaer was cast in a pivotal role as a "Holy Man". The screenplay was co-written by Rai and Freer Hunt. The music was composed by German composer Ernst Broadhurst. Devika Rani had recorded a song in the film including the Hindi version.

Karma, an "Indo-German-British" collaboration, was released two years after the Alam Ara (1931), the first Indian talkie. Karma was made targeting the international audience. The film was entirely shot in India while the post-production process was carried out in Stoll Studios, London. The film was the first talkie produced by Rai.

Release

The film initially premiered in London in May 1933. Devika Rani's performance was lauded by the critics in London. However, when the film was released later in Hindi as Naagan Ki Raagini, it failed to impress the Indian audience.

The film was among the first in India to feature an on-screen kiss. The four-minute long scene between Devika Rani and Rai, her husband in real life, is also known to being the longest such scene in Indian cinema. Upon release, the film became controversial in the then "orthodox India" for featuring a kissing scene.

Legacy
Though largely ignored in India during its release, Karma is considered a landmark in Indian cinema due to its unprecedented kissing scene. In 2012, The Times of India described it as the "first Indian talkie with English dialogue which set all London talking".

Notes

References

External links
 
 Full movie on YouTube
 Nagan Ki Ragini on indiancine.ma
  on filmifiza.com
 Filmi Fiza.

1933 films
Indian multilingual films
1930s Hindi-language films
Articles containing video clips
Indian black-and-white films
Indian romantic drama films
1933 romantic drama films
1933 multilingual films
1930s English-language films